The Whitsun Weddings is a collection of 32 poems by Philip Larkin.  It was first published by Faber in the United Kingdom on 28 February 1964.  It was a commercial success, by the standards of poetry publication, with the first 4,000 copies being sold within two months. A United States edition appeared some seven months later.

It contains many of Larkin's best known poems, such as "The Whitsun Weddings", "Days", "Mr Bleaney", "MCMXIV", and "An Arundel Tomb".

Poems
 Here
 Mr Bleaney
 Nothing To Be Said
 Love Songs in Age
 Naturally the Foundation will Bear Your Expenses
 Broadcast
 Faith Healing
 For Sidney Bechet
 Home is so Sad
 Toads Revisited
 Water
 The Whitsun Weddings
 Self's the Man
 Take One Home for the Kiddies
 Days
 MCMXIV
 Talking in Bed
 The Large Cool Store
 A Study of Reading Habits
 As Bad as a Mile
 Ambulances
 The Importance of Elsewhere
 Sunny Prestatyn
 First Sight
 Dockery and Son
 Ignorance
 Reference Back
 Wild Oats
 Essential Beauty
 Send No Money
 Afternoons
 An Arundel Tomb

See also
 List of poems by Philip Larkin
 1964 in poetry

1964 poetry books
English poetry collections
Poetry by Philip Larkin
Faber and Faber books